The 1996 Holiday Bowl was a college football bowl game played December 30, 1996, in San Diego, California. It was part of the 1996 NCAA Division I-A football season. It featured the Colorado Buffaloes, and the Washington Huskies.

Game summary
Washington scored first following a 2-yard touchdown run from running back Corey Dillon, and the Huskies opened up a 7–0 lead. Corey Dillon later scored on a 12-yard touchdown run, increasing Washington's lead to 14–0. 45 seconds later, Colorado quarterback Koy Detmer threw a 75-yard 'bullet' to wide receiver Rae Carruth to close Colorado to within 14–7.

In the second quarter, Nick Ziegler returned a Washington interception 31 yards for a touchdown, tying the game at 14. On the very next play, Jerome Pathon returned the kickoff 86 yards for a touchdown, and Washington reclaimed the lead at 21–14. Koy Detmer later threw a 7-yard touchdown pass to Darrin Chiaqverini for a 7-yard touchdown pass, and the score was tied at 21. Jeremy Aldrich kicked a 42-yard field goal before halftime, to put Colorado on top 24–21.

In the third quarter, Aldrich kicked a 36-yard field goal to increase Colorado's lead to 27–21. In the fourth quarter, Koy Detmer threw a 4-yard touchdown pass to Rae Carruth, but the 2-point conversion attempt was unsuccessful, and Colorado was up 33–21. They held on to that lead to win the game by that same margin. Koy Detmer went 25-for-45 for 371 yards and three touchdowns for Colorado. Defensive lineman Nick Ziegler was named defensive MVP.

References

Holiday Bowl
Holiday Bowl
Colorado Buffaloes football bowl games
Washington Huskies football bowl games
Holiday
December 1996 sports events in the United States